Grenke Chess Classic is an elite chess tournament held in the German cities of Karlsruhe and Baden-Baden and sponsored by . It was held annually between 2013 and 2019, with the exception of 2016. Due to the COVID-19 pandemic, both the 2020 and 2021 editions were cancelled.

Winners
{| class="sortable wikitable"
! # !! Year !! Winner
|-
| style="text-align:center;"|1||2013||
|-
| style="text-align:center;"|2||2014||
|-
| style="text-align:center;"|3||2015||
|-
| style="text-align:center;"|–||2016|| style="text-align:center;"|Tournament not held
|-
| style="text-align:center;"|4||2017||
|-
| style="text-align:center;"|5||2018||
|-
| style="text-align:center;"|6||2019||
|}

2013
Six players participated in the first edition of Grenke Chess. The winner was Viswanathan Anand ahead of Fabiano Caruana; they scored 6.5 and 6 out of 10, respectively.

{| class="wikitable" style="text-align: center;"
|+ 1st Grenke Chess Classic, 7–17 February 2013, Baden-Baden, Germany, Category XIX (2714)
! !! Player !! Rating !! 1 !! 2 !! 3 !! 4 !! 5 !! 6 !! Total !! Wins !! TPR
|- style="background:#cfc;"
| 1 || align=left| || 2780 || || ½ ½ || ½ ½ || ½ ½ || 1 1 || ½ 1 ||6½|| || 2811
|-
| 2 || align=left| || 2757 || ½ ½ ||  || 1 ½ || ½ 0 || 1 1 || ½ ½ ||6|| || 2778
|-
| 3 || align=left| || 2640 || ½ ½ || 0 ½ ||  || ½ ½ || 0 1 || ½ 1 ||5|| 2 || 2729
|-
| 4 || align=left| || 2725 || ½ ½ || ½ 1 || ½ ½ ||  || 0 ½ || ½ ½ ||5|| 1 || 2712
|-
| 5 || align=left| || 2716 || 0 0 || 0 0 || 1 0 || 1 ½ ||  || ½ 1 ||4|| || 2642
|-
| 6 || align=left| || 2667 || ½ 0 || ½ ½ || ½ 0 || ½ ½ || ½ 0 ||  ||3½|| || 2614
|}

2014
Arkadij Naiditsch, the highest-rated German chess player won the 2014 edition of Grenke Chess Classic ahead of David Baramidze. This edition was not a supertournament, and was a national competition: all eight participants came from Germany. It was a single round robin, and two spots were provided for the players to win entry into the next edition of 2015.

{| class="wikitable" style="text-align: center;"
|+ 2nd Grenke Chess Classic, 6–12 September 2014, Baden-Baden, Baden-Württemberg, Germany, Category XV (2609)
! !! Player !! Title !! Club !! Rating !! 1 !! 2 !! 3 !! 4 !! 5 !! 6 !! 7 !! 8 !! Total !! Wins !!  !!  !! TPR
|- style="background:#cfc;"
| 1 || align=left| || GM || OSG Baden-Baden || 2715 || || ½ || ½ || 1 || 0 || 1 || 1 || 1 ||5|| || || || 2752
|-
| 2 || align=left| || GM || SV Hockenheim || 2599 || ½ ||  || 0 || 1 || ½ || ½ || 1 || ½ ||4|| 2 || || || 2661
|-
| 3 || align=left| || GM || Mülheim-Nord 1931 || 2633 || ½ || 1 ||  || ½ || ½ || ½ || ½ || ½ ||4|| 1 || || || 2656
|-
| 4 || align=left| || GM || OSG Baden-Baden || 2672 || 0 || 0 || ½ ||  || 1 || ½ || 1 ||½ ||3½|| 2 || 0 || 1 || 2600
|-
| 5 || align=left| || IM || SV Werder Bremen || 2521 || 1 || ½ || ½ || 0 ||  || 0 || ½ || 1 ||3½|| 2 || 0 || 0 || 2622
|-
| 6 || align=left| || GM || OSG Baden-Baden || 2652 || 0 || ½ || ½ || ½ || 1 ||  || ½ || ½ ||3½|| 1 || || || 2603
|-
| 7 || align=left| || IM || SV Hockenheim || 2499 || 0 || 0 || ½ || 0 || ½ || ½ ||  || 1 ||2½|| || || || 2523
|-
| 8 || align=left| || GM || OSG Baden-Baden || 2582 || 0 || ½ || ½ || ½ || 0 || ½ || 0 ||  ||2|| || || || 2455
|}

2015
The tournament was played between 2–9 February 2015. With an average rating of 2752, it is the strongest edition of Grenke Chess in its history. 
Among the participants were Magnus Carlsen, Fabiano Caruana, Viswanathan Anand and Levon Aronian. The winner was Magnus Carlsen, who eventually won a five-game tiebreak with Arkadij Naiditsch with a score of 3–2 (two rapid, two blitz and one armageddon game).

{| class="wikitable" style="text-align: center;"
|+ 3rd Grenke Chess Classic, 2–9 February 2015, Baden-Baden, Germany, Category XX (2750)
! !! Player !! Rating !! 1 !! 2 !! 3 !! 4 !! 5 !! 6 !! 7 !! 8 !! Total !! TB !! Wins !! TPR
|- style="background:#cfc;"
| 1 || align=left| || 2865 || ||0 ||1 ||½ ||½ ||½ ||1 ||1 ||4½|| 3 || || 2835
|-
| 2 || align=left| || 2706 ||1 ||  ||½ ||½ ||½ ||½ ||½ ||1 ||4½|| 2 || || 2858
|-
| 3 || align=left| || 2738 ||0 ||½ ||  ||½ ||½ ||½ ||1 ||1 ||4|| || 2 || 2802
|-
| 4 || align=left| || 2811 ||½ ||½ ||½ ||  ||1 ||½ ||½ ||½ ||4|| || 1 || 2791
|-
| 5 || align=left| || 2777 ||½ ||½ ||½ ||0 ||  ||½ ||1 ||½ ||3½|| || 1 || 2746
|-
| 6 || align=left| || 2711 ||½ ||½ ||½ ||½ ||½ ||  ||½ ||½ ||3½|| || 0 || 2755
|-
| 7 || align=left| || 2797 ||0 ||½ ||0 ||½ ||0 ||½ ||  ||1 ||2½|| || || 2641
|-
| 8 || align=left| || 2594 ||0 ||0 ||0 ||½ ||½ ||½ ||0 ||  ||1½|| || || 2544
|}
 Notes
 Final rapid/blitz/armageddon tie-break: Magnus Carlsen def. Arkadij Naiditsch, 3–2.
 FIDE Ratings as of February 2015.

2017
The 2017 tournament took place from 15 to 22 April in Karlsruhe and Baden-Baden.

2018

 Notes
 The tiebreaks were as follows: 1) number of wins; 2) number of black wins; 3) head-to-head.
 2018 Grenke Chess Open A swiss tournament was won by 13-year-old German player Vincent Keymer with a score of 8/9. Keymer thus qualified for the Grenke Chess Classic 2019.

2019

 Grenke Chess Open 2019 Swiss-system tournament was won by  GM Daniel Fridman (2629) with a score of 7½/9.

References

External links

Official website of Grenke Chess Tournament

Chess competitions
International sports competitions hosted by Germany
Chess in Germany
Baden-Baden
Sport in Karlsruhe
Recurring sporting events established in 2013
2013 establishments in Germany